Astacus (from the Greek , , meaning "lobster" or "crayfish") is a genus of crayfish found in Europe and western Asia, comprising three extant (living) species and three extinct fossil species.

Due to the crayfish plague, crayfish of this genus have declined in many European regions, being replaced by the invasive North American signal crayfish, which carries the plague but is unaffected by it.

Classification

Astacus belongs to the family Astacidae, one of the three families of Northern Hemisphere freshwater crayfish within the superfamily Astacoidea. The internal phylogeny of Astacidae can be shown in the cladogram below:

Extant species
Astacus astacus (Linnaeus, 1775) - known as the "European crayfish", "noble crayfish" or "broad-fingered crayfish" - it is distributed across Europe, in France throughout Central Europe, to the Balkan Peninsula, and north as far as parts of the British Isles, Scandinavia, and the western parts of the former Soviet Union. It is the most common species of crayfish in Europe, and a traditional foodstuff. Like other crayfish, A. astacus is restricted to fresh water, living only in unpolluted streams, rivers, and lakes. Males may grow up to 16 cm long, and females up to 12 cm.
Astacus balcanicus (Karaman, 1929) - found in the Vardar river basin, Lake Pamvotida (Greece) and Lake Ohrid (North Macedonia/eastern Albania)
Astacus colchicus Kessler, 1876 - can be found in Rioni river basin (Georgia)

Fossil species
?Astacus edwardsii Van Straelen, 1928 - France - proposed to new genus Emplastron in 2021 study
Astacus laevissimus Fritsch & Kafka, 1887 - Czech Republic
Astacus multicavatus Bell, 1863 - United Kingdom

References

Astacidae
Crustacean genera
Taxa named by Johan Christian Fabricius